Lipochaeta succulenta, the seaside nehe, is a plant endemic to all the main Hawaiian islands except Lanai.

It is restricted to coastal areas below  elevation, and common in beach areas along the Nā Pali coast of Kauai.

References

Heliantheae
Endemic flora of Hawaii
Flora without expected TNC conservation status